Year 113 (CXIII) was a common year starting on Saturday (link will display the full calendar) of the Julian calendar. At the time, it was known as the Year of the Consulship of Celsus and Crispinus (or, less frequently, year 866 Ab urbe condita). The denomination 113 for this year has been used since the early medieval period, when the Anno Domini calendar era became the prevalent method in Europe for naming years.

Events 
 By place 
 Roman Empire 
 Trajan's Column near the Colosseum in Rome is completed to commemorate the Emperor's victory over the Dacians in the Second Dacian War.
 Osroes I of Parthia violates the treaty with Rome by installing a puppet ruler in Armenia. Emperor Trajan marches east, without first attempting to use diplomacy to resolve the disagreement.
 Emperor Trajan sails from Rome to begin his expedition against Parthia. He arrives in Athens where Parthian envoys greet him with olive branches, a sign of peace.
 Trajan declares Armenia to be annexed and it becomes a Roman province.
 Basilica Ulpia is dedicated.

 Asia 
 Last (7th) year of Yongchu era of the Chinese Eastern Han Dynasty.
 "Pattini dheivam" worship is inaugurated in Kannagi Temple in the Chera Kingdom in India, by Emperor Cenkuttuvan; the function is attended by GajaBahu, king of Central Sri Lanka (Mahavamso).

Births 
 Adrianus, Greek sophist philosopher (d. 193)
 Gnaeus Claudius Severus Arabianus, Roman senator and philosopher (d. after 176)

Deaths 
 Pliny the Younger, Roman lawyer and scientist (b. AD 61)

References